First Wives Club is an American comedy television series, based on the 1996 film of the same name written by Robert Harling, that premiered in September 19, 2019 on BET+. The series was renewed for a second season on November 26, 2019, and premiered on July 15, 2021. On September 8, 2021, the series was renewed for a third season. Unlike the original film, the series features an entirely African-American cast.

Premise
The First Wives Club is set in New York City and follow "three women, Ari, Bree, and Hazel who band together after their marriages fall apart, and who find strength in their sisterhood – and of course a little revenge."

Cast and characters
Michelle Buteau as Dr. Bree Washington
Jill Scott as Hazel Rachelle
Ryan Michelle Bathe as Ariel "Ari" Montgomery (née Carmichael)
Mark Tallman as David Montgomery
RonReaco Lee as Gary Washington
Malik Yoba as Derrick Ellsworth
Tara Pacheco as Versace 
Bill Barrett as Jacob Rosen 
Jordan Carlos as Curtis 
Deborah Cox as Regina 
Bailey Tippen as Megan 
Gary Dourdan as Dr. Malcolm Reynard 
Michelle Mitchenor as Jayla Wright 
Mikhail Keize as Nigel 
Jaxon Rose Moore as Imani Washington
Auston Jon Moore as Ollie Washington
Chase Dillon as Ollie Washington
Naledi Murray as Imani Washington
Tobias Truvillion as Khalil 
Raymond Greene-Joyner as Big

Episodes

Season 1 (2019)

Season 2 (2021)

Season 3 (2022)

Production

Development
On March 13, 2016, it was announced that TV Land had given a pilot order to the production. The episode was set to be written by Rebecca Adelman and executive produced by Jenny Bicks. On June 3, 2016, it was also reported that Karen Rosenfelt would executive produce the series and that Paramount Television would serve as the main production company for the project. Both Rosenfelt and Bicks had been producers on the original 1996 film. TV Land also revealed the premise of the pilot which was described as "Set in present-day San Francisco, the story revolves around three women – friends and classmates in the '90s – who reconnect after their close friend from college dies in a freak accident. When they discover that they are all at a romantic crossroads, they band together to tackle divorce, relationships and life's other annoying challenges." On November 11, 2016, it was announced that TV Land had passed on the pilot but that it was possible for it to be redeveloped.

On March 30, 2017, Kevin Kay, president of Paramount Network, TV Land, and CMT, talked about the series in an interview with Deadline Hollywood. In the interview he mentioned that the intention was for the production to move from TV Land and to be redeveloped as a new pilot at the Paramount Network. On October 2, 2017, it was announced that Tracy Oliver would write the redeveloped pilot. It was also expected that Karen Rosenfelt would executive produce this version of the project as well. On April 5, 2018, Paramount Network officially gave the production a pilot order. It was also reported that Scott Rudin, a producer of the original film, would act as executive producer for the series. On April 19, 2018, it was announced that Paramount Network had given the production a series order for a first season consisting of ten episodes. On November 27, 2018, it was reported that Paramount Network was reevaluating their plans for a night of dramedy programming and that as such the series would instead premiere on Paramount Network's sister network BET. On December 20, 2018, it was announced that the series would feature numerous easter eggs and callbacks to the original film including a newly-recorded version of the song "You Don't Own Me".

Casting
On June 3, 2016, it was announced that Alyson Hannigan and Megan Hilty had been cast as two of the three female leads in the series. Hannigan was cast as Maggie, similar to  Diane Keaton's character in the film, who was described as an English professor in San Francisco who once had aspirations of being a poet. Stuck in a failing marriage, it is after her old college friend dies that she decides to make changes in her life. Hilty was cast as Kim, similar to Goldie Hawn's character in the film, who was described as previously successful who had "aged out" of Hollywood. She continues to keep herself in shape, acts in commercials, and hopes for her big break to come along. Divorced and living with her 8-year-old son, she is happy to have her old friends in her life again. Later that month, it was reported that Vanessa Lachey had been cast to round out the trio of main characters. She was cast as Sasha, a successful chef with a girlfriend she plans to marry who begins to question settling down once her friends reenter her life.

In August 2018, it was announced that Michelle Buteau, Jill Scott, and Ryan Michelle Bathe had been cast in the lead roles of the second iteration of the series. On September 24, 2018, it was reported that Mark Tallman, RonReaco Lee, and Malik Yoba had been cast in the series' lead male roles.

Filming
Principal photography for the series commenced on September 28, 2018, in New York City. Filming had concluded by the week of December 10, 2018.

Release
On December 20, 2018, a "first look" still image from the series was released featuring Michelle Buteau, Jill Scott, Ryan Michelle Bathe in character as Bree, Hazel, and Ari, respectively.

References

External links

2010s American black sitcoms
2020s American black sitcoms
2019 American television series debuts
BET+ original programming
English-language television shows
Live action television shows based on films
Television series by Paramount Television
Television shows set in New York City